Pioneer is a restored nineteenth century schooner sailing out of South Street Seaport in New York, New York.

History
Pioneer was built in Marcus Hook, Pennsylvania in 1885 as a cargo sloop. She was the first of only two American cargo sloops ever built with a wrought iron hull. After ten years of service in the Delaware Bay, she was re-rigged as a schooner for easier handling.

In 1930, the Pioneer was sold to a buyer in Massachusetts. By this point, she had been fitted with an engine and no longer being used as a sailing vessel. She was sold again in 1966 to Russell Grinnell, Jr. of Gloucester for use in his dock building business. Grinnell restored Pioneer'''s schooner rig and rebuilt her hull in steel plating, leaving the iron frame intact. Upon his death in 1970, he donated Pioneer to the South Street Seaport Museum.

Popular culturePioneer appears in Episode 1 of Season 1 of the HBO series "Boardwalk Empire," in a scene set on the water showing illegal liquor being transported by boat.

Present day

The Pioneer'' sails seasonally from South Street Seaport in Manhattan, offering daily sails to the public as well as charter sails and educational programs for children.

The crew is a combination of professionals and volunteers.

See also
 List of schooners

References

Pioneer official site
article in New York Magazine

Museum ships in New York (state)
Schooners of the United States
Individual sailing vessels
Tall ships of the United States
Two-masted ships
1885 ships
South Street Seaport
Ships built in Pennsylvania